William Alexander "Chauncey" Stuart was a Major League Baseball middle infielder. He played in 1895 and 1899, with the Pittsburgh Pirates in 1895 and the New York Giants in 1899.

Biography 

Stuart was born on August 28, 1873, in Boalsburg, Pennsylvania. He threw and batted right-handed, he was 5'11", 170 pounds and he attended Penn State University where he was a half back for the varsity football team. Stuart died on October 14, 1928, in Fort Worth, Texas. His body was laid to rest in Branch Cemetery in State College, Pennsylvania.

Baseball career 

Stuart made his big league debut on August 15, 1895, with the Pittsburgh Pirates at the age of 21, playing 19 games that year (2 at second base and 17 as shortstop) and hitting .247 with 0 home runs and 10 RBI. He returned to the Major Leagues in 1899 to play for the New York Giants (playing only one game at second base that season) and collected zero hits in three at-bats. Stuart's overall career fielding percentage was unremarkable, at .912.

Sources

References

Pennsylvania State University alumni
1873 births
1928 deaths
Pittsburgh Pirates players
New York Giants (NL) players
Major League Baseball shortstops
Baseball players from Pennsylvania
Penn State Nittany Lions baseball players
19th-century baseball players
Scranton Indians players
Shenandoah Huns players
Franklin Braves players
Williamsport Demorest Bicycle Boys players
Toronto Canadians players
Albany Senators players
Newark Colts players
Richmond Giants players
Bradford Pirates players
New Haven Blues players
Springfield Ponies players
Hartford Indians players
Minor league baseball managers
Coffeyville Glassblowers players